Paul Albers (born October 15, 1985) is a Canadian former professional ice hockey defenceman who played in the American Hockey League (AHL) with the Houston Aeros.

Playing career
Albers played major junior in the Western Hockey League (WHL) for five seasons with the Calgary Hitmen, Regina Pats and Vancouver Giants.  As an overaged player with the Giants in 2005–06, Albers recorded a major junior career high 17 goals, 45 assists and 62 points.  He was named to the WHL West First All-Star Team, along with teammate Dustin Slade, and earned a nomination for the Bill Hunter Memorial Trophy as the league's top defenceman (awarded to Kris Russell of the Medicine Hat Tigers).  His +39 plus/minus was a league high and earned him the WHL Plus-Minus Award.  Albers added 19 points in 18 post-season games, helping lead the Giants to a President's Cup as WHL champions.  Playing in the subsequent 2006 Memorial Cup in Moncton, he was named to the Tournament All-Star Team with teammate Gilbert Brulé.

Undrafted by a National Hockey League (NHL) club, Albers turned pro in the ECHL with the Texas Wildcatters in 2006–07.  He recorded 43 points as a rookie and moved up to the American Hockey League (AHL) with the Houston Aeros the next season. On July 31, 2009, he left the United States and signed for German club Nürnberg Ice Tigers.

Albers spent six seasons of his professional career abroad, the last three with SG Cortina in the Italian Serie A before retiring at the conclusion of the 2014–15 season.

Career statistics

Awards
Named to the WHL West First All-Star Team in 2006
Won the WHL Plus-Minus Award in 2006
Won a President's Cup as WHL champions with the Vancouver Giants in 2006
Named to the Memorial Cup All-Star Team in 2006

References

External links

1985 births
Living people
Canadian expatriate ice hockey players in Italy
Canadian expatriate ice hockey players in Germany
Canadian expatriate ice hockey players in the United States
Calgary Hitmen players
Canadian ice hockey defencemen
SG Cortina players
Houston Aeros (1994–2013) players
Ice hockey people from Saskatchewan
Krefeld Pinguine players
Sportspeople from Melville, Saskatchewan
Regina Pats players
Texas Wildcatters players
Thomas Sabo Ice Tigers players
Tohoku Free Blades players
Vancouver Giants players